Vallegrande (Spanish: "Big Valley") is a small colonial town in Bolivia, located in the Department of Santa Cruz, some 125 km (bee-line) southwest of Santa Cruz de la Sierra. It is the capital of the Vallegrande Province and Vallegrande Municipality and serves as a regionally important market town.

The town was the first burial site of revolutionary Che Guevara, after his 1967 execution.

History
Vallegrande was founded by the Spanish in 1612 under the name Ciudad de Jesús y Montes Claros de los Caballeros del Vallegrande (Town of Jesus and Montes Claros of the knights of Vallegrande). It was intended to serve as a frontier to prevent the constant raids of the Guarani (Chiriguano) warriors that dominated the region. Many of the original inhabitants of Vallegrande were Sephardic and Ashkenazic Jews converted to Catholicism and persecuted by the inquisition in Spain and nearby La Plata and Potosi, for they were suspected to continue to secretly practice Judaism. Others came from Santa Cruz de la Sierra as Vallegrande became the main transit point in the route that connected Santa Cruz with the mines of Peru.

During the 18th and 19th centuries Vallegrande steadily grew and became the urban and cultural center of the region with a population of 25,000 by 1900. In the 20th century, though, concurrent with the rise of the nearby Santa Cruz, Vallegrande's importance gradually declined.

Geography

Overview
The town lies in a big valley (hence the name) at an altitude of 2,030 m (6,660 ft) and has approximately 6,000 inhabitants. It has a mild temperate climate due mainly to its valley location, altitude, and the cold winter fronts the sweep the plains of Santa Cruz known as "Surazo".

Climate
Vallegrande has a subtropical highland climate (Köppen: Cwb). Temperatures are relatively temperate annually, with high levels of diurnal temperature variation due to the altitude. Precipitation falls mainly during summer storms, while winter is marked by a drying period.

Economy
The main industries in the area revolve around agriculture and its derived products. The region is mainly dedicated to the production of grains such as corn and wheat, and fruits such as peaches, apples, grapes, pears, chirimoyas and plums. Among the value added products the most important are homemade bread, chamas, fruit liquor, wine, handmade rugs, and other handcrafts.

Transport
Vallegrande can be accessed via a spur road branching off the (old, southern) Santa Cruz to Cochabamba highway and has an airstrip off Av Circunvalación 2do Anillo.

Personalities

Che Guevara
On October 8, 1967, the Argentine Marxist revolutionary Che Guevara was captured by the CIA-assisted Bolivian Army nearby La Higuera, where he was killed the next day. The body was buried in Vallegrande, on an airstrip near Av. Circunvalación 2do Anillo, and was returned to Cuba in October 1997, where he was buried in a mausoleum in Santa Clara. A "Che Guevara Mausoleum" is located in Vallegrande on the former burial site and can be visited by tourists.

See also
War of the Republiquetas

References

External links

 Vallegrande.org website
 Vallegrande.com.bo website
 Map of Vallegrande Province
Vallegrande Travel Guide
The Che Trail in Bolivia
Che Guevara Route, Vallegrande Region

Populated places in Santa Cruz Department (Bolivia)
Che Guevara
Populated places established in 1612
1612 establishments in the Spanish Empire